S-61 Delfín  (Dolphin in Spanish) is a diesel-electric submarine of the Daphné-class (known in Spain as the Delfín class) that was used by the Spanish Navy between 1973 and 2003. During his 30 years of service, he participated in various national and international exercises and maneuvers, made more than 2,500 voyages, made more than 30,000 hours of immersion and served in this submarine more than a thousand sailors. At the time of her retirement, she was the longest-serving submarine in the history of the Spanish Submarine Fleet.

In 2004 it was donated by the Navy to the town of Torrevieja (province of Alicante, Valencian Community) and converted into a museum ship, thus becoming the first "floating museum" of these characteristics in Spain. It is part of the Museo del Mar y de la Sal (Museum of the Sea and Salt). In the first ten years as a museum it received more than a million visitors.

Construction and features 

It was built in the shipyards of Cartagena (Murcia). It's keel laying was carried out on August 13, 1968 and it was launched on March 25, 1972.

It is a French-designed Daphné-class submarine (known as Delfín class or S-60 series in Spain) displaces 860 t on the surface, while submerged it displaced 1040 t. It has a length of 57.75 m, a beam of 6.74 m and a draft of 5.25,2 m. It was propelled by a diesel-electric system, made up of two diesel engines and two electric motors that transmitted to two propellers, with which it reached 13 knots of speed on the surface, and 15.5 knots submerged. The submarine was designed to dive to a depth of 300 m (980 ft) and its autonomy is 30 days.

Regarding its armament, it has 12 torpedo tubes of caliber 550 mm; eight tubes in the bow, two in the stern and one in each fin. While the forward tubes contain full-length torpedoes (either against a ship or against a submarine), the aft tubes only contain shorter torpedoes (only against submarines, in self-defense). It has the possibility of replacing torpedoes with mines, but its great Achilles' heel is the impossibility of carrying reserve torpedoes due to the limited space available.

It is designed for type missions:

patrols against surface or submarine forces
attack on maritime traffic
recognition
mined
special operations

History 
The Delfin-class submarine defense program (also called the S-60 series) was approved by the National Defense Board on November 17, 1964 with Pedro Nieto Antúnez as Minister of the Navy and comprised the first two submarines, later expanded to two plus and financed by law 85/65 of November 17. With an initial cost of 700 million pesetas for the first two, the third in the series rose to 1,040 million pesetas (1964).

The names and numbers of the units in the series were assigned by ministerial order 218/73 of March 29. They were named after marine animals: Delfín (Dolphin), Tonina, Marsopa (Porpoise) and Narval (Narwhal), which had a certain precedent in the fleeting Foca class (Seal class) and Tiburón class (Shark class), although, with few exceptions (those mentioned above and the Peral, Monturiol, Cosme García, García de los Reyes, Mola and Sanjurjo), the submarines of the Spanish Navy used to be identified until then only by their numerals.

The Delfín (S-61) was registered in the official list of the Navy on May 3, 1973 in the port of Cartagena in a ceremony attended by the then Minister of the Navy Admiral Adolfo Baturone Colombo.

Throughout its operational life, the Delfín participated in several international maneuvers together with ships from other countries, for example in June 1996 it participated in the Tapón ’96 maneuvers together with the Spanish ships Príncipe de Asturias, Santa María , Numancia and Baleares , the Americans USS Grayling and USS Conolly and the Greek destroyer Formion.

Between 1984 and 1988 , during their first major careening, the Delfín-class submarines underwent a modernization that fundamentally included the weapons system, to be able to launch wire-guided torpedoes and the dsm (underwater detection) system. The modernization gave a somewhat different look to the bow of the submarines, changing the bow dome (jokingly nicknamed the nose), where the sonar is located.

In 1985 he mistakenly fired a torpedo at the Cartagena base.

On May 27, 1989, King Juan Carlos I reviewed the fleet at a naval stop in the waters of Barcelona. In this naval parade, the Dédalo, Príncipe de Asturias, the Baleares frigates: Andalucía, Extremadura and Victoria, the corvettes  Descubierta class, Diana, Vencedora and Infanta Cristina, the submarines Delfín and Marsopa participated, among others.and other smaller units; as representatives of other countries, among others, the french Foch, the Italian Giuseppe Garibaldi, the American missile cruiser USS Belknap or the Portuguese frigate Comandante Hermenegildo Capelo.

In 1994 it suffered damage to the fairing of the free movement after a self-launched exercise torpedo hit it. The torpedo made a strange trajectory and ended up attacking launch ship.

The Delfín-serie submarines were decommissioned between 2003 and 2006; in the particular case of the Delfín (S-61) it was officially decommissioned on September 10, 2003 (although it was planned to do so on July 2, 2003, the Portuguese navy was interested in it and although in the end no agreement was reached your discharge was postponed). At that time, she was the Spanish submarine that had served the longest uninterruptedly in the Spanish Navy, after 30 years of service.

It was donated by the Spanish Navy as a museum ship since 2004 to the city of Torrevieja (Alicante), a town that sponsored it for the Navy after its launch and gave it its first combat flag in 1971. Specifically, it arrived towed by the tug civilian Sea Nostromo Primero on May 8, 2004. Since then, she has been moored in the port of that town and is part of the Museo del Mar y de la Sal (Museum of the Sea and Salt). After its installation there in the first ten years it exceeded million visits.

In 2015, he participated in an international amateur radio transmission for 48 hours in an initiative that tried to put all the existing floating museums in the world in contact. In 2019 it became the first floating museum to be adapted for people with functional diversity.

See also 
 List of submarines of the Spanish Navy
 List of retired Spanish Navy ships

References

External links 

 Información y horario de visita al Submarino Ayuntamiento de Torrevieja
 Información para visitar el Submarino S-61 Delfín Portal de turismo de la Comunidad Valenciana
 La Armada despide a su submarino más veterano Revista Naval (10 de septiembre de 2003)
 Características Generales de la clase Delfín La Vanguardia (24 de marzo de 1974)
 Datos técnicos del Submarino Los Barcos de Eugenio
 EXPERIENCIAS A BORDO DE UN SUBMARINO DE LA CLASE “DELFIN” por Antonio Bergoños González, ex-comandante del Delfín
 El Arma Submarina 100 años en imágenes (1915-2015) Ministerio de Defensa
 S-61 Delfín Submarine. Torrevieja Marine LPSPhoto (fotos, página en inglés)
 Submarino museo S-61 DELFIN (Torrevieja) Vídeo en YouTube
 Enjoy Directo: El Submarino Delfín de Torrevieja Vídeo en YouTube

Submarines of the Spanish Navy
Museum ships in Spain
1972 ships
Daphné-class submarines
Ships built in Cartagena, Spain